G. Petar Arnaudov (born August 8, 1986, in Plovdiv, Bulgaria) is a Bulgarian chess player and co-founder of modern-chess.com. G. Petar Arnaudov received the International Master (IM) title in 2009 and Grandmaster (GM) in 2013. He is currently living in The Hague.

He was part of the Bulgarian national team in 2013 and is the current team champion of Bulgaria. He is a chess publisher and writer and writes opening articles for New in Chess, Chess base Magazine and Modern Chess Magazine.

Notable Tournaments

References

Living people
1986 births
Chess grandmasters
Bulgarian chess players
Chess writers
Chess players from Plovdiv